Live 2004 may refer to:

Live 2004 (Planxty album)  by the Irish folk band Planxty
NBA Live 2004